The Carnegie Library of Pittsburgh – South Side located at 2205 East Carson Street in the South Side Flats neighborhood of Pittsburgh, Pennsylvania, was built in 1909.  It was designed by the architectural firm Alden & Harlow,  and it was added to the List of Pittsburgh History and Landmarks Foundation Historic Landmarks in 1990.

References

Library buildings completed in 1909
Libraries in Pittsburgh
Carnegie libraries in Pennsylvania
1909 establishments in Pennsylvania